Bunodera is a genus of flatworms belonging to the family Allocreadiidae.

The species of this genus are found in Europe and Northern America.

Species:
 Bunodera acerinae Roitman & Sokolov, 1999 
 Bunodera eucaliae (Miller, 1936) Miller, 1940

References

Platyhelminthes